Yogeshvara, is a Sanskrit epithet employed in Hinduism. The term Yogeshvara is a portmanteau of yoga and ishvara, meaning 'Lord of Yoga', 'Lord of Yogis', or 'God of Yoga'. The term is primarily employed to address the deities Shiva and Krishna.

Hinduism 
The term is an epithet of Krishna in Vaishnavism, who is also known as Parameshvara, the supreme god.

Yogeshvara is a main deity in the Swadhyaya Movement, along with Shiva, Ganesha, and Parvati.

References

Hindu philosophical concepts
Names of God in Hinduism
Vedanta